Ubiquinone biosynthesis protein COQ4 homolog, mitochondrial is a protein that in humans is encoded by the COQ4 gene.

References

External links

Further reading